Claude Daniel Houde (born November 8, 1947) is a Canadian retired professional ice hockey defenceman who played 59 games in the National Hockey League for the Kansas City Scouts from 1974 to 1976. Most of his career, which lasted from 1970 to 1977, was spent in the minor leagues, mainly in the American Hockey League. As a youth, he played in the 1960 and 1961 Quebec International Pee-Wee Hockey Tournaments with Drummondville.

Career statistics

Regular season and playoffs

References

External links

1947 births
Living people
Baltimore Clippers players
Beauce Jaros players
Canadian ice hockey defencemen
Ice hockey people from Quebec
Kansas City Scouts players
Providence Reds players
Sportspeople from Drummondville
Syracuse Blazers players
Toledo Hornets players
Undrafted National Hockey League players
Virginia Wings players